WOTR may refer to:

 The War of the Ring Online Campaign
 WOTR (FM), a radio station (96.3 FM) licensed to Lost Creek, West Virginia, United States
 WWCB, a radio station (1370 AM) licensed to Corry, Pennsylvania, United States, used the WOTR call sign from 1955-1972
 The Wars of the Roses
 The War of the Rohirrim